Homelink may refer to:

 Lianjia, formerly Homelink, a Chinese real estate company
 HomeLink Wireless Control System
 Homelink (Britain), a 1980s home banking system